WXON-LD is an independent low-power television station in Flint, Michigan and licensed to Millington, Michigan. It is not to be confused with the former WXON-TV, which is now WMYD, the independent station in Detroit, Michigan and Windsor, Ontario—the station's owners, P&P Cable Holdings, got the WXON calls shortly after that station became WDWB—then of which becoming WMYD. P&P is known for picking up calls no longer used by Michigan's TV and radio stations and reusing them for their own LPTV properties.

The station broadcast on channel 54, but did not cover all of Flint. The station broadcast at 100 watts from a transmitter on Dort Highway (M-54, fittingly), covering a small area to the southeast of Mount Morris. It had a construction permit to increase power to 150 kW from a location near Otisville, which would have covered Flint and northwestern Genesee County with its directional beam; however, the construction permit expired in February 2008, and was not renewed.

The station had a translator station, W09CK, which covers part of the north side of Flint at 85 watts.

Since the DTV transition in the United States did not affect low power stations, WXON-LP never applied to broadcast in digital.

The actual date of the station's closure is unknown; the license for WXON-LP was cancelled by the Federal Communications Commission in January 2012.  The FCC re-licensed the station on July 14, 2021. The station transmits from a communications tower on Lewis Road east of Clio, Michigan.

References

External links
Michiguide: More info on Flint's WXON
Michiguide: More info on P&P Cable Holdings
FCC records for WXON-LP

XON-LP
Defunct television stations in the United States
Television channels and stations established in 1999
1999 establishments in Michigan
Television channels and stations disestablished in 2012
2012 disestablishments in Michigan
XON-LP
Heartland (TV network) affiliates
Retro TV affiliates
Rev'n affiliates